= Revenue Tariff Party =

Revenue Tariff Party may refer to:

- Free Trade Party (1887–1909), also known as the Revenue Tariff Party
- Revenue Tariff Party (Tasmania), which won two seats in the 1903 federal election, and joined the Free Trade Party
